The Mahapola Higher Education Scholarship Trust Fund (also known as the Mahapola Trust Fund or the Mahapola Scholarship) is an educational trust fund created and operated by the Government of Sri Lanka. Established by Lalith Athulathmudali, the Minister of Trade and Shipping through the Mahapola Higher Education Scholarship Trust Fund Act No. 66 of 1981, its objective is the provision of financial assistance to students undertaking higher education. The original funds were raised by Athulathmudali through personal donations and a series of regional fairs known as Mahapola. The Trust is managed by a Board of Trustees chaired by the Chief Justice. 

The fund has also founded the Development Lotteries Board and the Sri Lanka Institute of Information Technology.

References

Higher education in Sri Lanka